Getgood is a surname. Notable people with the surname include:
 George Getgood (1892–1970), Scottish professional footballer
 Robert Getgood (1882–1964), politician and trade unionist in Northern Ireland
 Adam "Nolly" Getgood, former bassist for the American progressive metal band Periphery